The Forthing T5 is a compact CUV produced by Dongfeng Liuzhou Motor under the Forthing or originally Dongfeng Fengxing sub-brand. A larger 7-seater mid-size crossover variant called the Forthing T5L is also offered from the 2019 model year.

Overview
The Forthing T5 was launched as a compact Crossover sport utility vehicle under the Fengxing or Forthing brand of Dongfeng Motor Group for China, it officially debuted as a prototype during the 2018 Beijing Auto Show in April 2018, with the production version fitting the National Standard V Emission standard of China available from Q3 2018. 

The updated English name of the original Fengxing brand was also launched with the Dongfeng Fengxing T5 which is "Forthing", with the name labeled on the tailgate of the T5.

Prices ranges from 84,900 yuan to 135,900 yuan.

2019 facelift (National Standard VI)

A facelift of the Forthing T5 fitting the National Standard VI emission standard of China was revealed at the 2019 Shanghai Auto Show featuring a slightly restyled front fascia which looks like current Renault lineup's design language.

The 1.5 liter turbo version is available with either a 6-speed manual gearbox or a CVT, while the 1.6 liter turbo diesel version is only available with a 7-speed DCT.

Forthing T5L

A pre-production model was revealed during the 2018 Chengdu Auto Show called the Fengxing T7, a seven-seater mid-size crossover that will be positioned above the original Fengxing T5, which is essentially a longer version of the T5, and was later renamed to Forthing T5L for the production version. The model hit the market on 30 March 2019 as the Forthing T5L.

Interior
The Forthing T5L is a 7-seater in 2+3+2 layout, the second and third rows can be folded flat. The trunk volume of the Forthing T5L in the 5-seat state reaches 1600L, and with the second and third rows of seats are all folded up, the trunk capacity can expand to 2370L. The interior features include a push-button starter, hill descent control, electronic handbrake, panoramic sunroof and panoramic imaging.

Powertrain
The Forthing T5L is powered by a 1.6 liter turbo engine, codenamed CE16, which is based on the development of BMW N13 engine.

References

External links
Dongfeng Fengxing T5 Official website

Compact sport utility vehicles
Crossover sport utility vehicles
Fengxing T5
Cars introduced in 2018
Front-wheel-drive vehicles
Cars of China